Mammillaria morganiana, common name owl's eyes or owl-eye pincushion, is a cactus in the genus Mammillaria of the family Cactaceae. The epithet morganiana honors the U.S. optometrist Meredith Walter Morgan (1887-1957) of Richmond.

Description
Mammillaria morganiana is a spherical or slightly cylindrical cactus, reaching a diameter of about 8 inches. This plant is pale blue-green, densely covered by woolly whitish tubercles. The 4-5 central spines are straight, about 1 foot long, while the 40 to 50 radial spines are very thin or hairlike and reach about 1.2 inches. The funnel-shaped flowers are creamy white to pink, with central red venation, about 1.5 inches long and wide. The red-brown fruits contain the seeds.

Distribution
This species is native to the Mexican state of Guanajuato.

Habitat

References
 
 Urs Eggli, Leonard E. Newton: Etymological Dictionary of Succulent Plant Names. Springer, Berlin/Heidelberg 2010, S. 158.
  Mammillarias.net

morganiana
Plants described in 1933